Provo is the fourth-largest city in Utah, United States. Provo is the largest city and county seat of Utah County and is home to Brigham Young University (BYU).

Provo lies between the cities of Orem to the north and Springville to the south. With a population at the 2020 census of 115,162. Provo is the principal city in the Provo-Orem metropolitan area, which had a population of 526,810 at the 2010 census. It is Utah's second-largest metropolitan area after Salt Lake City.

Provo is the home to Brigham Young University, a private higher education institution operated by the Church of Jesus Christ of Latter-day Saints (LDS Church). Provo also has the LDS Church's largest Missionary Training Center (MTC). The city is a focus area for technology development in Utah, with several billion-dollar startups. The city's Peaks Ice Arena was a venue for the Salt Lake City Winter Olympics in 2002.

In 2015, Forbes cited Provo among the "Best Small And Medium-Size Cities For Jobs," and the Bureau of Labor Statistics found Utah County had the year's highest job growth. In 2013, Forbes ranked Provo the No. 2 city on its list of Best Places for Business and Careers. Provo was ranked first for community optimism (2012) and first in health/well-being (2014).

History

The Provo area was originally called Timpanogas, a Numic (Ute people) word perhaps meaning "rock river". The area was inhabited by the Timpanogos. It was the largest and most settled area in modern-day Utah. The ample food from the Provo River made the Timpanogos a peaceful people. The area also served as the traditional meeting place for the Ute and Shoshone tribes and as a spot to worship their creator.

Father Silvestre Vélez de Escalante, a Spanish Franciscan missionary-explorer, is considered the first European explorer to have visited the area in 1776. He was guided by two Timpanogos Utes, whom he called Silvestre and Joaquín. Escalante chronicled this first European exploration across the Great Basin Desert. The Europeans did not build a permanent settlement but traded with the Timpanogos, whom they called Lagunas (lake people) or Come Pescado (fish eaters).

In 1847, the Mormon pioneers arrived in the Salt Lake Valley, which was just north of Timpanogos Mountain. At first, the Natives were friendly with the Mormons. But, as relations deteriorated with the Shoshoni and Utes because of disputes over land and cattle, tensions rose. Because of the reported stolen goods of settlers by the Utes, Brigham Young gave small militia orders "to take such measures as would put a final end to their [Indian] depredations in future." This ended in what is known as the Battle Creek massacre, in modern-day Pleasant Grove, Utah.
 
The Mormons continued pushing into Timpanog lands. In 1849, 33 Mormon families from Salt Lake City established Fort Utah. In 1850, Brigham Young sent an army from Salt Lake to drive out the Timpanogos in what is called the Provo War. Escalating tensions with the Timpanog contributed to the Walker War. Fort Utah was renamed Provo in 1850 for Étienne Provost, an early French-Canadian trapper who arrived in the region in 1825.

In 1850, the first schoolhouse was constructed in Provo, built within Utah Fort.

As more Latter-day Saints arrived, Provo quickly grew as a city. It soon was nicknamed The Garden City with a large number of fruit orchards and gardens there.

In 1872, a railroad reached Provo. It was also this year that the Provo Woolen Mills opened. They were the first large factory in Provo and employed about 150 people, initially mainly skilled textile laborers who had emigrated from Britain.

Geography

The Wasatch Range contains many peaks within Utah County along the east side of the Wasatch Front. One of them, known as Y Mountain, towers over the city. There is a large hillside letter Y made of whitewashed concrete halfway up the steep mountain, built in the early part of the 20th century to commemorate BYU (original plans included construction use of all three letters). Wild deer (and less frequently, cougars, and moose) still roam the mountains (and occasionally the city streets). The geography allows for hiking, skiing, fishing and other outdoor activities.

Climate
Provo's climate can be classified as either a hot-summer Mediterranean climate classification (Köppen Csa) or as a cool semi-arid climate (Köppen BSk).
 
Very cold weather may occur when cold air from over the Continental Divide invades the region: although only four mornings fall to or below  during an average winter and this temperature was not reached at all between 1999 and 2006, during the very cold January 1917 (average temperature ), seventeen mornings fell this cold. By contrast, in several recent winters like 1994–95, 1995–96, 1999–2000, 2004–05, and 2005–06, averages have been above freezing every month.
 
 
Being too far north to gain any influence from the monsoon except in rare cases like the  rainfall of August 1983, Provo's summers are hot and dry, though relatively short – no maxima above  have been recorded outside the range of June 7 to August 27.
 
The fall season sees steady cooling and a transition to winter weather, with rare influences of rain systems from further south, as in the record wet month of September 1982, which saw  of total precipitation, including  over the last six days from a storm moving from Arizona. The last maximum of  can be expected around September 10, and the first morning below freezing on October 14.

Demographics

2010 census
At the 2010 census, 112,488 people, 31,524 households and 21,166 families resided in the city. The racial makeup of the city was 84.8% White, 0.7% Black or African American, 0.8% American Indian, 2.5% Asian, 1.1% Pacific Islander, 6.6% from other races, and 3.4% from two or more races. Hispanic or Latino of any race were 15.2% of the population.

There were 31,524 households, of which 34.8% had children under 18 living with them, 55.4% were married couples living together, 8.2% had a female householder with no husband present, and 32.9% were non-families. 12.8% of all households were made up of a single individual, and 4.7% had someone living alone who was 65 years of age or older. The average household size was 3.24, and the average family size was 3.41.

22.3% of residents are under 18, 36.4% are from 18 to 24, 24.8% are from 25 to 44, 10.5% from 45 to 64, and 5.8% who were 65 years of age or older. The median age was 23.3 years. For every 100 females, there were 98.2 males. For every 100 females aged 18 and over, there were 96.4 males.

2000 census
At the 2000 census, 105,166 people, 29,192 households and 19,938 families resided in the city. The racial makeup of the city was 88.52% White, 0.46% Black or African American, 0.80% American Indian, 1.83% Asian, 0.84% Pacific Islander, 5.10% from other races, and 2.44% from two or more races. Hispanic or Latino of any race were 10.47% of the population.

There were 29,192 households, of which 33.8% had children under 18 living with them, 57.0% were married couples living together, 7.8% had a female householder with no husband present, and 31.7% were non-families. 11.8% of all households were made up of a single individual, and 4.6% had someone living alone who was 65 years of age or older. The average household size was 3.34, and the average family size was 3.40.

22.3% of residents were under 18, 40.2% from 18 to 24, 23.2% from 25 to 44, 8.6% from 45 to 64, and 5.7% were 65 years of age or older. The median age was 23 years. For every 100 females, there were 92.6 males. For every 100 females aged 18 and over, there were 89.3 males.

The median household income was $34,313, and the median family income was $36,393. Males had a median income of $32,010 and females $20,928. The per capita income was $13,207. About 12.5% of families and 26.8% of the population were below the poverty line, including 14.4% of those under age 18 and 4.3% of those aged 65 or over.

The residents of Provo are predominantly members of the Church of Jesus Christ OF Latter Day Saints. According to data taken in 2000 by the ARDA, 88% of the overall population, and 98% of religious adherents in the Provo-Orem area are Latter-day Saints. According to a study in 2015, the Provo-Orem metro area is about as dissimilar to the rest of America as possible. Weighing factors such as race, housing, income, and education, the study ranked Provo-Orem 376th of 381 of the United States' largest cities in terms of resemblance to the country.

Religion

The breakdown in 2010 for Utah County was as follows: Most people (90.6%) were Christian, with Latter-day Saints constituting 88.7% of the population. Catholics constituted 1.3% and Protestants constituted 0.6%. Other religions constituted 0.3% of the population. 9.1% of the population did not adhere to any religion.

Economy

Local companies
Provo has more than 100 restaurants (with over 60 in the downtown area) and a couple of shopping centers. The Shops At Riverwoods and Provo Towne Centre, both shopping malls, operate in Provo. Several small shops, music venues, and boutiques have popped up downtown, along Center Street and University Avenue. Downtown has also begun to host  "gallery strolls" every first Friday of the month that features local artists. There are many dining establishments in and around downtown Provo.

Five Provo companies are listed on Inc.com's Inc. 5000 list of the fastest-growing private companies in the United States. The largest, DieCuts With a View, is ranked number 1403 and has revenues of $26.2 million. Other companies on the list are VitalSmarts (ranked 4109, with $41.4 million in revenue), and Connect Public Relations (ranked 3694, with $6.1 million in revenue). The global recreation and entertainment company Ryze Trampoline Parks, with locations throughout Asia, Europe and the U.S., is headquartered in Provo.

Novell, the dominant personal computer networking company from the mid-1980s through the mid-1990s, was headquartered in Provo and occupied several buildings at the height of its success. It was eventually acquired by The Attachmate Group and then by Micro Focus, which still maintains facilities there.

The Food & Care Coalition is a local organization providing services to the homeless and low-income citizens of Provo and Utah Counties. They also provide volunteer opportunities.

International companies

Action Target, a shooting range manufacturer.
Aquaveo is a water modeling software company.
Morinda Bioactives (formerly Tahitian Noni International) is a multi-level marketing health and skin care manufacturer whose products are based on the Tahitian fruit called noni.
North American Arms, a firearms manufacturer.
Nu Skin Enterprises, a multi-level marketing firm for skin care products, was founded in 1984.
Qualtrics, a private research software company.
Vivint (formerly APX Alarm Security Solutions) is a residential security company with customers.

Top employers
According to Provo's 2019 Comprehensive Annual Financial Report, the top employers in the city were:

Arts and culture

Annual cultural events

Every July, Provo hosts America's Freedom Festival at Provo which includes the Stadium of Fire at BYU. It is held in LaVell Edwards Stadium, home to BYU's NCAA football team. The Independence Day festivities are popular among residents and have featured such notable figures as Bob Hope, David Hasselhoff, Reba McEntire, Mandy Moore, Huey Lewis and the News, Toby Keith, Sean Hannity, Fred Willard, and Taylor Hicks. In 2015, the event included performances by Journey and Olivia Holt, and was hosted by television personality Montel Williams.

Provo has two other large festivals each fall. Festival Latinoamericano is an annual family-oriented Labor Day weekend event in downtown Provo that offers the community a taste of the region's Hispanic culture through ethnic food, vendors, and performances.

The city has hosted an annual LGBT Provo Pride Festival since 2013.

Points of interest

Covey Center for the Arts
The Covey Center for the Arts, a performing arts center, is at 425 West Center Street. It features plays, ballets, art showcases, and musical performances throughout the year. The size of the building is 42,000 total square feet. The main performance hall seats 670 people. Three dance studios are furnished with a piano, ballet bars, and mirrors. Another theater, the Brinton Black Box Theater, seats 60 for smaller, more intimate events. There are also two art galleries: the 1,620-square-foot Secured Gallery and the Eccles Gallery in the lower lobby.

LDS Church Missionary Training Center
Provo is the location of the church's largest missionary training center. Each week approximately 475 missionaries enter for 3–9 weeks of training before they depart for the mission field, becoming part of more than 58,000 in more than 120 countries. About 1,100 instructors (many of them returned missionaries) teach 62 languages. The MTC in Provo began construction in July 1974 and was completed in July 1976. The MTC was expanded in the early 1990s to become the largest of the 17 such centers than in the world. Additional construction was completed in 2017.

Provo City Library at Academy Square
The Provo City Library is a public library that occupies the building of the former Brigham Young Academy, built-in 1892. The building was added to the National Register of Historic Places in 1976. Its collection contains over 277,000 media. The library is on University Avenue and 550 North.

Provo Recreation Center
With construction finished in 2013, the center provides a location for aquatic recreation next to the Provo Power plant.

Provo Utah Temple
The Provo Utah Temple is at the base of Rock Canyon in Provo. This temple is among the busiest in the LDS Church due to its proximity to BYU and the MTC.

Provo City Center Temple 
Located at the corner of University Avenue and Center Street, the Provo City Center Temple serves as another temple for the Provo area's Latter-day Saint population. After a fire in 2010 destroyed the Provo Tabernacle, Thomas S. Monson, then LDS Church president, announced the site would become the city's second temple. Renovations were finished and the temple was dedicated in March 2016.

Utah Valley Convention Center
The Utah Valley Convention Center opened in 2012.  It has 83,578 square feet of combined meeting, pre-function and garden space.

Lakeside Storage and Museum
Lakeside Storage and Museum is the largest Petroliana Museum of its kind in the World. It has more original porcelain Gas/Oil signs posted on poles than any other collection. 
The Museum includes the oldest Brands of gas and oil begun in Utah in 1908, known as the Utah Oil Refining Company and later revised to UTOCO. 
The museum also includes antique gas pumps, airplanes, antique cars, and fuel delivery vehicles, as well as a Steam-powered and other powered antique tractor collection. 
It is a free, family-friendly, and photo-friendly site to visit next to Utah Lake State Park in Provo.

Other points of interest

 Bridal Veil Falls (Utah), Provo Canyon, Utah County, Utah - A scenic waterfall 10 miles Northeast of Provo
 Brigham Young University Arboretum
 BYU Museum of Paleontology
 LaVell Edwards Stadium - home of the NCAA college football BYU Cougars as well as Stadium of Fire, an annual 4th of July fireworks show and concert
 The Marriott Center - home of the NCAA college basketball BYU Cougars. The Marriott Center is also used for large university gatherings, such as devotionals, guest lectures, and graduation ceremonies
 (Mount Timpanogos) Timpanogos Peak - the mountain forms the northern horizon of Provo
 Peaks Ice Arena, hockey venue for the 2002 Winter Olympic Games
 The Provo River, a river known for fishing and the Provo River Parkway, a paved bicycle and walking trail adjacent to the river
 Reed O. Smoot House, a National Historic Landmark, at 183 East 100 South
 Seven Peaks Water Park, the largest water park in Utah.
 The Shops At Riverwoods, a center of residences, retail, and entertainment at the mouth of Provo Canyon
 Timpanogos Cave National Monument
 Uinta-Wasatch-Cache National Forest, a national forest on the Wasatch Front bordering the east edge of Provo and Utah Valley
 Utah Lake, a fresh-water lake popular for fishing, boating, and other recreational activities

Government

Federally, Provo is part of Utah's 3rd congressional district, represented by Republican John Curtis, elected in 2017.

City administration

Provo is administered by a seven-member city council and a mayor. Five of the council seats are elected by individual city districts, and two of the seats are elected by the city as a whole. These elected officials serve four-year terms, with elections alternating every two years. Provo has a Mayor–council government, which creates two separate but equal branches of government. The mayor is chief executive of the city and the council is the legislative and policy-making body of the city. The mayor is Michelle Kaufusi, who has been in office since December 5, 2017.

Education

Higher education
BYU is a private university operated by the Church of Jesus Christ of Latter-day Saints. BYU is the third-largest private university in the United States, with more than 34,000 students. It is the flagship of the Church Educational System of higher education. On the campus is the Spencer W. Kimball Tower, the tallest building in Provo.

Rocky Mountain University of Health Professions is a private, for-profit university emphasizing graduate healthcare education. The Northwest Commission accredits the university of Colleges and Universities (NWCCU). RMUoHP offers programs in nursing practice, physical therapy, occupational therapy, and health science. RMUoHP will be building Utah County's first new medical school.

Provo College is a private, for-profit educational institution specializing in career education. The school is accredited by the Accrediting Council for Independent Colleges and Schools (ACICS). Provo College offers associate degrees and diplomas in fields such as nursing, medical assisting, criminal justice, graphic design, and office administration.

Primary and secondary education

Almost all of Provo is within the Provo School District. The school board has seven members, each representing a different district of the city. There are thirteen elementary schools, two middle schools, and three high schools. Provo High School was the first school in Utah County to be an IB World school. The school has a record of 4A state basketball championships, more state champions than any other school in the state. Timpview High School has a record of 4A state football championships.

A small section of the city lies within Alpine School District.

Transportation

Interstate 15 runs through western Provo, connecting it with the rest of the Wasatch Front and much of Utah. US-89 runs northwest to southeast through the city as State Street, while US-189 connects US-89 with I-15, BYU, and Orem to the north. At the north edge of the city, US-189 heads northeast into Provo Canyon, where it connects with Heber.

Amtrak, the national passenger rail system, provides service to Provo station, operating its California Zephyr daily in both directions between Chicago, Illinois, and Emeryville, California (in the San Francisco Bay Area). Provo also can be accessed by Salt Lake Express intercity buses and the extensive Utah Transit Authority (UTA) bus system. UTA's commuter rail service, the FrontRunner, opened an extension to Provo from Salt Lake City on December 10, 2012. The Provo Intermodal Center, adjacent to the Amtrak station, connects the FrontRunner with local bus routes, as well as Greyhound service.

The Provo Municipal Airport is Utah's second busiest airport regarding the number of aircraft take-offs and landings. Allegiant Airlines has been based out of the airport since 2022.

People

Provo is home to (or the hometown of) many well-known people, including The Osmonds (including Donny, Marie, and the Osmond Brothers), LDS Church apostle Dallin H. Oaks, and NFL and BYU quarterback Steve Young. Robert Redford also maintains a home at the nearby Sundance Resort, just up Provo Canyon.
Goodwin Knight, who served as the 35th Governor of California (1947–1953), was born in Provo. The global economist Dambisa Moyo moved to Provo following her marriage to Qualtrics co-founder Jared Smith.

Sister cities
Provo has three sister cities designated by Sister Cities International:
 Nanning, China
 Chengdu, China
 Meissen, Germany

See also

 List of cities and towns in Utah

References

External links

 
 Provo historical images at the Harold B. Lee Library, Brigham Young University
 Aerial view of Provo, Utah, MSS SC 2962 at L. Tom Perry Special Collections, Harold B. Lee Library, Brigham Young University
 

 
Cities in Utah
Cities in Utah County, Utah
County seats in Utah
Populated places established in 1849
Wasatch Front
1849 establishments in the United States